Les Martres may refer to:

 Les Martres-d'Artière : French commune situated in the département of Puy-de-Dôme
 Les Martres-de-Veyre : French commune situated in the département of Puy-de-Dôme

See also 
 Martres 
 La Martre (disambiguation)